Embreeville is the name various places in the United States:

 Embreeville, Pennsylvania
 Embreeville, Tennessee